Louis Scott may refer to:

Louis Scott (soldier) (1887–1967), British-born Canadian officer
Louis Scott (runner born 1889) (1889–1954), 
Lou Scott (born 1945), American distance runner
Louis Scott (actor) (born 1982), Thai-Scottish actor

See also
Lewis Scott (disambiguation)
Scott (name)